The 4th constituency of the Loire (French: Quatrième circonscription de la Loire) is a French legislative constituency in the Loire département. Like the other 576 French constituencies, it elects one MP using a two round electoral system.

Description

The 4th constituency of the Loire lies to the south of Saint-Etienne in the south of the department.

The seat has generally favoured candidates from the centre-right however in both 1988 and 1997 the voters opted for a Communist Party deputy. Since 2002 the seat has reliably conservative although incumbent Dino Cinieri held on by only 99 votes in 2017.

Assembly members

Election results

2022

 
 
|-
| colspan="8" bgcolor="#E9E9E9"|
|-

2017

2012

References

4